Tin Latt is a retired Burmese physician and diplomat.

Life
From 2000 to 2002 he was ambassador in New Delhi.
In 2002 he was ambassador in Pretoria.
From 2002 to 2006 he was ambassador in Hanoi.
From 2008 to  ambassador in Kuala Lumpur.

References

1949 births
Ambassadors of Myanmar to Nepal
Ambassadors of Myanmar to India
Ambassadors of Myanmar to South Africa
Ambassadors of Myanmar to Vietnam
Ambassadors of Myanmar to Malaysia
Living people
University of Medicine 2, Yangon alumni